Gammel Strand 50 is a historic property overlooking Slotsholmens Kanal in central Copenhagen, Denmark. The building was listed on the Danish registry of protected buildings and places in 1918.

History
The site was in 1790

18th century

The site was in the late 18th century made up of two separate properties. They were listed as No. 17 and 18 in Strand Quarter (Strand Kvarter) in Copenhagen's first cadastre of 1689 . They were at that time owned by Anders Søbødker (No. 17) and one  Jens Pedersen's widow Bente (No. 18):

The two properties were again listed as No. 17 and No. 18 in the new cadastre of 1756. They were at that time owned by Jens Hansen (No. 17) coppersmith Johan Christian Schellerup (No. 18=.

The properties were both destroyed in the Copenhagen Fire of 1795, together with most of the other buildings in the area.

No. 17 was subsequently merged with part of No. 18 by hat maker Gudman Petersen. The current building was constructed for him in 1796-97.

19th century
The property was listed as No. 15 in the new cadastre of 1806. The musician Holger Simon Paulli was a resident of the building in 1838. It was at that time still owned by Gudmund Petersen.

At the time of the 1840 census, No. 15 was home to one household on each floor. Frederike Christine Marx, a widow hatter, resided on the ground floor with her 28-year-old daughter Anine Victorine Franzine Marx, her 56-year-old brother Wendel Christine Greiler, her floor clerk Johanne Antoinette Geisler and the maid Mariane Catharine Keimer. Maria Andrea Sehested Krag and Sophie Augusta Krag, two unmarried women, most likely relatives, resided on the first floor with one maid. Anne Marie Plenge (née Tronier, 1793-1880), widow of Johannes Wilhelm Plenge, former pastor of Hørsholm Parish, resided on the second floor with her three children (aged 16 to 20) and one maid. Niels Eibe and Frederik Hendrik Eibe (aged 31 and 22), two theology students, resided on the third dloor. Niels Larsen, Larsen, who worked at the nearby Vejerhus, resided in the basement with his wife Johanne Cathrine Larsen and their two daughters (aged 12 and 17).

 
The writer H. V. Kaalund (1818-1885) lived in the building around 1849.

The property was home to 38 residents at the time of the 1860 census. Moses Levin Nathan, a Class-Lottery collector, resided on the first floor with his wife Hanne Nathan (née Hartig), their son Marcus Moses Nathan and one maid. Joseph Wulff, a medical doctor, resided on the second floor with his wife Line Wulff, their six children (aged 4 to 17), one maid and the 20-year-old woman Juliane Møller. Johannes Rohner, a retired customs official, resided in the garret with his wife Ane Dorthea (née Petersen), the 39-year-old married woman Mariane Møller (née Hansen, no mention of her husband), Møller's 11-year-old daughter Josephine Marie Møller and the lodger Hans Fritz Mathisen (law student). Hans Christian Hansen, proprietor of a tavern in the basement, resided in the associated dwelling with his wife Inger Christine F. Nielsen and their 8-year-old daughter. Frederik Larsen, a candles and yarn retailer, resided in another part of the basement with his wife Elsebe Mammesen. Søren Christian Hansen, a fisherman (røgter), resided on the ground floor of the side wing with his wife Karen Hansen and their 5-year-old daughter. Wilhelm Lau, a brick-layer, resided on the third floor of the side wing with his wife Sophia Lau, two children (aged 4 and 13) and a maid.

The building was heightened with one storey in 1853. The merchant C. W. Jøhncke  lived in the building and ran his company from the premises. A clerk in the company,  Hans Peder Kofod, tried to murder him by poisoning his coffee in 1856 after committing embezzlement. He was sentenced to death at the Supreme Court but the sentence was later converted to life in prison.

C. Simonsens Kunst- og Stentrykkeri was later based in the building.

Architecture

References

External links

 BBR information

Listed residential buildings in Copenhagen
Residential buildings completed in 1797